Bagnoregio is a comune (municipality) in the Province of Viterbo in the Italian region of Lazio, located about  northwest of Rome and about  north of Viterbo.

History 

The current main town was in ancient times a suburb of the hill town in the same comune now known as Civita di Bagnoregio. In ancient times this was called Novempagi and Balneum Regium, whence the medieval name of Bagnorea.

During the barbarian invasions of Italy, between the sixth and ninth centuries, the city was taken several times by the Ostrogoths and the Lombards. Charlemagne is said to have included it in the Patrimonium Petri, and the Emperor Louis I to have added it to the Papal States in 822.

It is famous as the birthplace (more specifically Civita di Bagnoregio) of the philosopher St. Bonaventure in the early 13th century. Writer Bonaventura Tecchi also hailed from Bagnoregio.

The mention in a letter of Pope Gregory the Great of a John newly elected as bishop of Bagnoregio is the earliest extant mention of a bishop of the see of Bagnoregio, but he was doubtlessly not the first bishop. The diocese grew over the centuries, incorporating in 1015 what had been the diocese of Bomarzo. After an earthquake in 1695, the cathedral that had been in Civita di Bagnoregio was replaced by one at Bagnoregio itself. In 1986, the diocese was incorporated into that of Viterbo, by whose bishop it was already administered since the death of the last diocesan bishop of Bagnoregio in 1971. No longer a residential bishopric, Bagnoregio is today listed by the Catholic Church as a titular see.

References

Sources and external links 
 
 
 GigaCatholic
 The Fraternity of the Most Holy Virgin Mary in Bagnoregio (in Italian).

Cities and towns in Lazio